Linda H. Gage is an American demographer. She is the former state demographer of California, and chief of the Demographic Research Unit of the California Department of Finance, where she worked since 1975. As of 2012, she was retired.

Early life
Gage earned a master's degree in sociology from the University of California, Davis in 1974, specializing in demography. She belongs to the advisory board of the program in demographic and social analysis at the University of California, Irvine.

Career
She served the Population Association of America as chair of its Committee on Population Statistics and in 1997, its Committee on Applied Demography, and also chaired the American Statistical Association Section on Government Statistics in 1997. She won the Founder's Award of the American Statistical Association in 2005, and was elected as a Fellow of the American Statistical Association in 2007.

References

Year of birth missing (living people)
Living people
American demographers
American women statisticians
University of California, Davis alumni
Fellows of the American Statistical Association
21st-century American women